Linz EHC was an ice hockey team in Linz, Austria. In 1992 it was re-established as EHC Black Wings Linz. They play their home games at Donauhalle.

Defunct ice hockey teams in Austria